Two-time defending champions Nicholas Taylor and David Wagner defeated Peter Norfolk and Johan Andersson in the final, 6–2, 7–6(7–5) to win the quad doubles wheelchair tennis title at the 2010 Australian Open.

Main draw

Finals

References
 Main Draw

Wheelchair Quad Doubles
2010 Quad Doubles